Buffalo Township is one of sixteen townships in Buchanan County, Iowa, United States.  As of the 2000 census, its population was 560. It was established in 1852.

Geography 

According to the USGS, it contains two cemeteries: Spangler and Stanley.

References

External links 

 City-Data.com

Townships in Buchanan County, Iowa
Townships in Iowa
1852 establishments in Iowa
Populated places established in 1852